Rostkowo may refer to:

 Rostkowo, Płock County, Poland
 Rostkowo, Przasnysz County, Poland, the birthplace of Saint Stanislaus Kostka